Michel Delire (6 August 1933 – 3 April 2006) was a Belgian footballer. He played in five matches for the Belgium national football team from 1957 to 1960.

References

External links
 

1933 births
2006 deaths
Belgian footballers
Belgium international footballers
Footballers from Hainaut (province)
Association football midfielders
Belgian football managers
R. Charleroi S.C. managers
R.A.E.C. Mons managers
R. Olympic Charleroi Châtelet Farciennes players
Standard Liège players